Harold Senior (born 1908) was an English professional footballer who played as an outside left.

Career
Born in Cleckheaton, Senior moved from Norristhorpe to Bradford City in November 1927. He scored 1 goal in 6 league appearances for the club, before moving to Derry City in July 1929. He later played for Peterborough & Fletton United and Frickley Colliery.

Sources

References

1908 births
Date of death missing
English footballers
Bradford City A.F.C. players
Derry City F.C. players
Frickley Athletic F.C. players
Peterborough & Fletton United F.C. players
English Football League players
Association football outside forwards